This is a list of films produced or shot on location in Jamaica, in alphabetical order.

#
 20,000 Leagues Under The Sea (1954), the cannibals scene

B
 Belly (1998)

C
 Club Paradise (1986) 
 Cocktail (1988)
 Cool Runnings (1993)
 Countryman (1982)

D
 Dancehall Queen (1997)
 Dr. No (1962)

G
 Glory to Gloriana (2006)

H
 The Harder They Come (1972)

I
 It's All About Dancing: A Jamaican Dance-U-Mentary (2006)

K
 Kingston Paradise (2013)
Knight And Day (2010)

L                                                                                                                                                                                                                                         

 Live and Let Die (1973)
Legends of the Fall (1994)

M
 Marked for Death (1990)
Manfish (1956)

N                                                                                                                                                                                                                                        

 No Time to Die (2021)

O
 One Love (2003)
 Out The Gate (2011)
 OUTDEH (2020)

P
 Predator 2 (1990)
Papillon (1973)

R
 Ring Games (2016)
 Rockers (1978)

S
 Shottas (2002)
 Smile Orange (1976)

T
 Third World Cop (1999)

W
 Wah Sweet Nanny Goat (2019)
 Wide Sargasso Sea (1993)

See also
 Cinema of the Caribbean
 Jamaican literature

References

External links
 http://www.jamaicanmovies.com
 Jamaican film at the Internet Movie Database
 Feature films shot in Jamaica
 Jamaican/Reggae film research and database

Jamaica

Films